Anna Lysenko (born 22 December 1991) is a Ukrainian boxer. She represented Ukraine at the 2016 World Championships and the 2020 Summer Olympics in Tokyo. She studied law in the Academy of Advocacy of Ukraine in Kyiv.

References

1991 births
Living people
Ukrainian women boxers
Boxers at the 2020 Summer Olympics
Olympic boxers of Ukraine